The municipality of San Gregorio de Polanco is one of the municipalities of Tacuarembó Department, Uruguay, established on 15 March 2010.

History 
The municipality of San Gregorio de Polanco was created by Law No. 18,653 of 15 March 2010, as part of Tacuarembó Department, that intended to cover the electoral constituency identified by series TED, the same territory as the Ninth Judicial Section of Tacuarembó. This new entity created under the new system of second level administrative divisions of Uruguay, replaced the former Non-Autonomous Local Board of San Gregorio de Polanco, which the former system was criticized due to their lack of self-governance and submission to departmental authorities.

Geography 
The municipality, part of Tacuarembó Department, is located at its south side, north of Negro River and west to the Tacuarembó River. The municipality has a total area of 444.7 km2, and it has 3722 inhabitants according the 2011 national census, with a population density of 8.4 inhabitants per square kilometer.

Settlements 
The following settlements are part of this municipality:
 San Gregorio de Polanco (seat)
 Paso Hondo
 Los Furtados
 Rolón
 Cañadas del Estado
 Rincón de Alonso
 Paso Real

Authorities 
The authority of the municipality is the Municipal Council, integrated by the Mayor (presiding it) and four Councilors.

References 

San Gregorio de Polanco